Loving Tyra is a Ugandan musical drama television series created by Denis Dhikusooka Jr. It stars Vivian Kaitesi as a Tyra, a celebrated recording artist who finds herself in a complicated relationship with a conman on the loose. The series premiered on Pearl Magic TV on February 6, 2020 and on Showmax in September 2020. Denis Dhikusooka Jr. who created the series also plays other roles as the producer and write as well as playing Mathias, the antagonist of the series.

Plot
Tyra is rich, famous, and has everything but yearns for love. Her quest for love leads her to a conman called Mathias. When Mathias escapes from prison, he needs a mark to con in order to get money. Tyra becomes his target. She falls in love with him not knowing who he is.

Cast

References

External links
 

Ugandan drama television series
2019 Ugandan television series debuts
2010s Ugandan television series
Musical television series
Pearl Magic original programming